Falkenhagen may refer to:

Places

Germany
Falkenhagen, a municipality of Märkish-Oderland, Brandenburg 
Falkenhagen (Falkensee), a civil parish of Falkensee, in the district of Havelland (Brandenburg)
Falkenhagen (Landolfshausen), a civil parish of Landolfshausen, in the district of Göttingen (Lower Saxony)
Falkenhagen (Lügde), a civil parish of Lügde, in the district of Lippe (North Rhine-Westphalia)
Falkenhagener Feld, a locality of the district of Spandau, Berlin

People
Adam Falckenhagen (1697–1754), German lutenist
Alfred M. Falkenhagen (1898-1968), American farmer and politician
Hans Falkenhagen (1895–1971), German physicist
Lena Falkenhagen (b. 1973), German writer